Nicolas Bovi (born 11 March 1993) is an Italian footballer who plays for ASC Arcetana.

Career
Born in Reggio Emilia, Bovi started his career at Modena's youth ranks. In 2009–2010 he was moved to Reggiana, and made his professional debut on 8 August 2010, in a Coppa Italia match against AlzanoCene.

On 20 January 2012, Bovi moved to Serie A club Cagliari Calcio.

On 4 August 2014 Bovi was signed by Pro Patria in a temporary deal, re-joining teammate Erik Panizzi. On 31 August 2015 he was released by Reggiana.

In November 2019, Bovi joined ASC Arcetana.

References

External links
 

Italian footballers
Aurora Pro Patria 1919 players
A.C. Reggiana 1919 players
Cagliari Calcio players
S.S.D. Correggese Calcio 1948 players
Serie C players
Serie D players
Association football midfielders
1993 births
Living people
Sportspeople from Reggio Emilia
Footballers from Emilia-Romagna